Golden Heights is a locality in the Riverland region of South Australia west of Waikerie. It is predominantly irrigated vineyards and orchards on higher ground, overlooking the Murray River to the north, and bounded by the Sturt Highway on the south.

References

Towns in South Australia